Zack Moore may refer to:
 Zack Moore (American football), American football coach and player
 Zack Moore (basketball), Japanese-American basketball player

See also
 Zach Moore, American football defensive end